Modbury Vista Junior Soccer Club is a soccer club from Wynn Vale, South Australia. 

Modbury Vista has teams playing in the South Australian State League 2, South Australian Women's State League, Football South Australia Women's Community Leagues, Football South Australia Junior Boys and Girls, Elizabeth & Districts Junior Soccer Association, and MiniRoos.

Their home ground is Newspot Stadium, Richardson Reserve.

Modbury Vista won the inaugural Women's State League in 2021 and with it automatic promotion to the Women's National Premier League SA for 2022.

External links
 Club Website

References

Soccer clubs in Adelaide
Association football clubs established in 1969
1969 establishments in Australia